Graham is an unincorporated community in Fountain County, Indiana, in the United States.

History
The first settlement at Graham was made in the 1820s.

References

Unincorporated communities in Fountain County, Indiana
Unincorporated communities in Indiana